Oblivion (stylized as ObLiViOn) was a punk rock group from the Chicago area.  The band was composed of Pete Kourim on bass guitar and lead vocals, Scott Ozark on guitar and back-up vocals, and Brian Czarnik on drums.

History 
The group started as a heavy metal cover band in 1988, but their style solidified to have more of a punk focus by the early 1990s.  During the late 90s, Oblivion had a strong following in the Chicago/Midwest punk scene.  Their musical stylings borrowed equal parts from punk, metal, and classic rock.  They released a number of 7"s and full-length albums primarily on Johann's Face Records, although they also released music on Dr. Strange, Underdog, and others.  Songs often commented on social interactions, stories about troubled girls, and relationship issues seen from a cryptic moody perspective.  The group sometimes made social commentary but mostly in an indirect and self-debasing way.  After more than a decade of playing together, the group disbanded.  They played a farewell show in March 2000.

Post-breakup 
 After the group disbanded, Brian moved to Florida and worked on a big cat (tigers/lions) sanctuary.  Scott played with the Nobs, while Pete continued to play in Mexican Cheerleader, a band that started while Oblivion still existed.

Reunion show
Oblivion played a reunion show on December 29, 2006 at the Abbey Pub in Chicago.  They performed with Apocalypse Hoboken.  This was the first show the band played in over five years.

Discography
S/T (cassette, 1st Demo) self-release 1989
Neighborhood (cassette, 2nd Demo) self-release 1990
Think Tightope Boobjob (cassette, 3rd Demo) self-release 1992 (self distributed at Lollapalooza)
Product (EP, 7") Johanns Face Records 1993
Full Blown Grover (ep, 7") Johanns Face Records 1994
Stop Thief (LP, 12"/CD) Johanns Face Records 1994
Shoot Me a Waco (LP, 12"/CD) Johanns Face Records 1995
Suckers From The Start (CD) Sinister Label 1998
Sweatpants U.S.A. (CD) Suburban Home 1999

Splits
split with No Empathy (split, 7") Underdog Records 1995
split with Humble Beginnings (split, 7") Medio-Core 1997
split with Apocalypse Hoboken (split, 7") Harmless Records 1997
split with Gods Reflex (split, 7") Johann's Face Records 1997
split with Man Dingo (split CD) Dr Strange Records 1999

Compilation appearances 
 A Very Punk Christmas (2x7") Rocco Records/Further Beyond 1993
 Dumpsterland No. 7 (zine + 7") Dumpsterland Zine 1994
 A Taste Of Chicago (CD) Strikeout Wreck-Chords 1995
 Achtung Chicago! Drei (LP 12"/CD) Underdog Records1995
 Punk: It's All About The Orchis Factor (CD) Suburban Home Records 1996
 ABC's Of Punk (LP 12"/CD) Whirled Records 1997
 Marc's A Dick And Gar's A Drunk (LP 12"/CD) Johann's Face Records 1997
 The Check's In The Mail: The Rise And Fall Of The Rocco Empire (CD) Rocco Records 1998
 Girls Kick Ass! (CD) Punk Rock Onion 1999
 Capitol Radio (CD) Torque 1999
 Playing 4 Square, Vol. 1 (CD) Suburban Home Records 2000
 Magnetic Curses (CD) Thick Records 2000

Related bands
 Amish Vomit - Pete Kourim, with two others who would join The Vindictives, where the origins of the song "Stolen" came from.
 The Bollweevils - Brian Czarnik
 Mexican Cheerleader - Pete Kourim
 The Nobs - Scott Ozark

Sources
Johanns Face Records (Archived from the Internet Archive)
Centerstage Chicago
Knotmag.com Interview circa 2000
Mexican Cheerleader on MySpace

Musical groups established in 1988
Pop punk groups from Illinois